Irma Flaquer Azurdia (5 September 1938 - disappeared 16 October 1980), was a Guatemalan psychologist and reporter known for her pointed critiques against the Guatemalan government.

Biography
Born to a Catalan theater producer father, Fernando Flaquer, and Guatemalan opera singer mother, Olga Azurdia, she spent her childhood travelling and living throughout Central and South America. In 1955, she married Fernando Valle Avizpe and later divorced in 1958. That same year (1958) she started a column in the Guatemalan newspaper La Hora, entitled "Lo que otros callan" which she would later transfer over to La Nación in the years 1971 to 1980. She had two sons, Sergio Valle and Fernando Valle.

Disappearance
In 1970, she had a hand grenade thrown into her car, injuring only her hand. On October 16, 1980, Irma attended her grandson's fourth birthday party. It was also believed to be a last farewell to her son Fernando, his wife, Mayra Rosales, and her grandson, Fernando, before she left for Nicaragua the next day. While she and Fernando drove back to her apartment, they were stopped a block away from her apartment by two cars surrounding their car. Fernando was shot in the head and Irma cried out for a doctor for her son. She was grabbed and taken away. Her body has not been recovered and it is believed she was executed. She had been the first white, middle-class, professional woman to have been abducted and presumably murdered in Guatemala during that time. Her son, Sergio, who had been sent to live in a kibbutz in Israel in 1970 after the grenade incident, had received menacing, anonymous phone calls in Israel after his mother's disappearance for two years, claiming that she had gone crazy and was living in a basement.

The Inter American Press Association investigated the case of Irma Flaquer as part of its impunity project, and the case was the first that the IAPA brought to the Inter-American Commission on Human Rights, which ruled that the Guatemalan government was responsible for her disappearance, at the very least by not protecting her as a public figure.

The investigation also led to a book Disappeared, A Journalist Silenced by June Carolyn Erlick (Seal Press, 2004).

See also
List of Guatemalans
List of people who disappeared

References

External links
Irma Flaquer Azurdia (Crimes Against Journalists: Impunity Project)

1938 births
1980 deaths
1980s missing person cases
20th-century Guatemalan writers
20th-century journalists
20th-century women writers
Enforced disappearances in Guatemala
Guatemalan journalists
Guatemalan people of Catalan descent
Guatemalan women journalists
Journalists killed in Guatemala
Missing people
Missing person cases in Guatemala
People from Guatemala City